NDF or ndf may refer to:

Militaries
 National Defence Forces (Syria), a pro-Syrian government militia during the Syrian Civil War from 2011
 Norwegian Defence Force, the military of Norway
 Namibia Defence Force, the armed forces of Namibia

Organisations

 National Democratic Front (disambiguation), several political organisations
 National Democratic Force, in Burma
 Neighborhood Development Foundation, an urban-renewal project in New Orleans, US
 National Development Front, an Islamic political organization in South India
 Neue deutsche Filmgesellschaft (ndF), a film production company in Germany
 Nordic Development Fund, a regional bank of north European countries
 Norges Døveforbund, Norwegian Association of the Deaf.

Other uses
 Neutral density filter, a photographic filter
 Neutral detergent fiber, a fiber-evaluating method used in animal nutrition
 No defect found, things returned for repair not found to be faulty
 Non-deliverable forward, a financial instrument
 Non drop-frame, video type designation used in SMPTE timecode

See also
 FDN (disambiguation)
 FND (disambiguation)